Gabrielle Meyer (married name is Morère) (10 May 1947 – 18 November 2018) was a French athlete, who specialised in sprinting.

Biography 
Meyer won five champion of France (fr) titles, three in the 100 metres in 1965, 1966 and 1967, and two in the 200 metres in 1965 and 1966. In 1967, she won the gold medal in the 200m and the silver medal in the 100m during the Summer Universiade at Tokyo. In October 1967, in Mexico City, she equaled France's 200m record (fr) from Catherine Capdevielle in 23.7s. She participated in the 1968 Olympics in Mexico City. Eliminated in the quarterfinals of the 100m, she took eighth in the 4 × 100 m relay. She was selected 18 times for France.

Prize list

National 
 French Championships in Athletics:
 Winner of the 100m 1965, 1966 and 1967
 Winner of 200m 1965 and 1966

Records

References

External links 
 
 Dictionary of athletics by Robert Pariente: Extract in the No. 31 Wednesday, August 18, 1971 L'Equipe Magazine Athletics, with black and white photo of the applicant

1947 births
2018 deaths
French female sprinters
Olympic athletes of France
Athletes (track and field) at the 1968 Summer Olympics
Universiade medalists in athletics (track and field)
Universiade gold medalists for France
Universiade silver medalists for France
Medalists at the 1967 Summer Universiade
Olympic female sprinters
20th-century French women